Michael A. Fopp is a retired National Museum Director.

Michael Fopp is the son of an Australian Battle of Britain fighter pilot.  He grew up surrounded by aeroplanes, but left the Reading Blue Coat School to follow a childhood dream of riding horses professionally.  He was a member of the Mounted Branch of London’s Metropolitan Police for over 10 years.  Those years were spent leading major ceremonial celebrations, carrying out duties during riots and other public disorder events. All this ended when he was seriously assaulted by rioters in 1979, an event so serious as to cause the death of Blair Peach and injury to many others.

During his Police career he had special permission to lecture and write about aviation history and, almost immediately after his hospitalisation joined the Royal Air Force Museum as Keeper of the Battle of Britain Collection in 1979. In 1984 he was awarded a master's degree by City University London for whom he was a visiting lecturer in Management Studies for 9 years. In 1985 he was appointed Director of the London Transport Museum.  He returned to the Royal Air Force Museum as Director in 1988 and finished his thesis "Museum & Gallery Management" gaining his PhD in 1989.

He was the Director General of the RAF Museum's three sites – Hendon (London), Cosford and Stafford, all of which expanded significantly during his tenure of over 22 years – retiring in 2010.  Michael is an aviation historian (RAF History 1936–1955), not-for-profit management specialist and information technologist. He is a Fellow of the Royal Aeronautical Society and the Museums Association, past Council Member of The Air League, and holds both Commercial and Instrument ratings for single engined aircraft.  He is a Past Master of the Honourable Company of Air Pilots, a City of London Livery Company.  He is past Chairman of the Air Safety Trust and the Air Pilots Trust, charities supporting flying scholarships, air safety and research.

For many years he spent his spare time flying a Lancair aircraft which he built himself over a period of 8 years.  In 'retirement' he is in demand as a public speaker and lecturer in both aviation/transport history and management/leadership studies.  He maintains an enthusiasm and deep interest in computers, computer programming and the future technologies associated with these interests – he is also a keen chef and model racing yacht skipper.  He writes prolifically and his book Managing Museums & Galleries, published by Routledge, was the first book to provide the reader with museum/gallery specific solutions to management problems.  He is currently working on an academic study of the home-built aircraft movement.  In 2018 his book Spirit of the Royal Air Force – An anthology in words and works of art was published to celebrate the centenary of the RAF. He is a member of the Royal Air Squadron, and the Light Aircraft Association.  He is married to Rosemary who is also a private pilot and has one son who is a serving officer in the Royal Air Force.

In 2011, he was given an Award of Doctor of Science honoris causa by City University London.  He is in great demand as an enrichment speaker on a number of ocean cruise lines.

References

Directors of museums in the United Kingdom
English curators
Living people
Year of birth missing (living people)